Robert Frank Pence (born 1945) is an American businessman who was United States Ambassador to Finland. His nomination was confirmed by the Senate on March 22, 2018.

Career 

Pence founded The Pence Group (formerly known as Pence-Friedel Developers, Inc.), a commercial development firm, in 1984 and served as its president for more than thirty years. A Republican Party donor, he did not support the candidacy of Donald Trump but was recommended for an ambassadorial appointment by Vice President-elect Mike Pence, to whom he is not related.

A graduate of the Washington College of Law at American University, he is the namesake of the school's Pence Law Library.

Rescinding award from Jessikka Aro 
In 2019, the State Department selected Finnish journalist Jessikka Aro as a recipient of the prestigious International Women of Courage Award and notified her that she would be receiving the award. But the award was withdrawn after Ambassador Pence and others expressed concerns that Aro had authored social media posts that were critical of President Donald Trump and might make an anti-Trump political statement during the award ceremony.

The Office of the Inspector General at the State Department investigated the decision to withdraw the report and concluded that Department officials, including Ambassador Pence, lied to Congress and the public about its reasons for rescinding the report.

References

External links

Ambassador biography

1945 births
Living people
20th-century American businesspeople
21st-century American businesspeople
Virginia Republicans
Ambassadors of the United States to Finland
University of Maryland, College Park alumni
American University alumni
Washington College of Law alumni
Yale University alumni
Trump administration personnel